Both Sides of the Gun, is Ben Harper's seventh album, released in 2006. Split into two discs, the title suggests the two sides of Harper's musical nature. The first disc ("White") is made of mostly acoustic and string-driven songs hinted at on the last track ("She's Only Happy In The Sun") of Harper's previous album Diamonds on the Inside. The second disc ("Black") is made up of the more rock and upbeat material and touching on genres such as hard rock, funk and gospel.

A number of tracks on "Both Sides of the Gun" crackle with intensity and outrage over the political climate in the United States, particularly "Black Rain," the lyrics to which Harper posted last September on his official Web site. The cut lashes out at President Bush's handling of Hurricane Katrina, proclaiming, "Don't speak to us like we work for you / Selling false hope like some new dope we're addicted to / I'm not a desperate man but these are desperate times at hand / This generation is beyond your command."

The first disc is a quiet, intimate affair. It opens with the wistful, string-addled ballad "Morning Yearning" and moving on to the Nick Drake-influenced solo guitar confessional "More Than Sorry" and the unabashedly sentimental closer "Happy Everafter in Your Eyes," an ode to Harper's wife, actress Laura Dern.

The second half of "Both Sides" delves into a variety of styles, from the swaggering, Black Crowes-style rocker "Get It Like You Like It" to the raw blues of "The Way You Found Me" and the slow-burning, largely instrumental jam "Serve Your Soul" that closes the album.

The album saw Harper playing the majority of the instruments on both discs; an approach that he had rarely used on his previous albums. However, the Innocent Criminals would appear on a few tracks whilst his later band, Relentless7, would appear together for the first time on "Serve Your Soul", the last track on the second disc.

The album became Harper's first US top 10 hit on the Billboard Hot 200 album charts, peaking at number seven. As of April 2007, it has sold 126,000 copies in United States.

Track listing
All songs written by Ben Harper, except as indicated.

Disc 1 - "White"
"Morning Yearning" – 4:09
"Waiting for You" (Ben Harper, Michael Ward) – 3:34
"Picture in a Frame" (Ben Harper, Michael Ward, Juan Nelson, Oliver Charles, Jason Yates, Leon Mobley) – 4:36
"Never Leave Lonely Alone" – 2:51
"Sweet Nothing Serenade" – 2:44
"Reason to Mourn" – 4:26
"More Than Sorry" (Ben Harper, Danny Kalb) – 3:24
"Cryin' Won't Help You Now" – 2:35
"Happy Everafter in Your Eyes" – 2:31

Disc 2 - "Black"
"Better Way" – 3:58
"Both Sides of the Gun" – 2:44
"Engraved Invitation" – 2:55
"Black Rain" (Ben Harper, Jason Yates) – 2:57
"Gather 'Round the Stone" – 3:08
"Please Don't Talk About Murder While I'm Eating" – 2:34
"Get It Like You Like It" – 3:27
"The Way You Found Me" – 2:53
"Serve Your Soul" – 8:22

Disc 3 (Special Edition package only)

The album was also released as a limited special edition box set including a bonus CD featuring four alternate mixes and two live tracks.

"Gather ‘Round The Stone" (Alternate Version Mix)
"Reason to Mourn" (Alternate Mix)
"Get It Like You Like It" (Live, Acoustic)
"Waiting for You" (Alternate Mix)
"Morning Yearning" (Alternate Mix)
"Beloved One" (Live)

Personnel
Ben Harper - Vocals, slide guitar, acoustic guitar, Weissenborn, electric guitar, bass guitar, drums, percussion, piano, vibes,
Juan Nelson - Bass
Oliver Francis Charles - Drums
Leon Mobley - Percussion
Jason Yates - Keys
Matt Cory - Bass
Michael Ward - Guitar, bass
JP Plunier - Drums
Charlie Musselwhite - Backing vocals
David Lindley - Tambura
Greg Kurstin - Hammond B3
Marc Ford - Guitar
Alyssa Park, Joel Pargman, Patrick Rosalez, Brett Banducci, Timothy Loo - Strings
David Palmer - Keys
Danny Kalb - Guitar, sound engineer
Jan Ghazi - Electric guitar, backing vocals
Nick Sandro - Bass, backing vocals
Jason Mozersky - Guitar
Scott Thomas - Backing vocals
Jose Medeles - Drums
Jesse Ingulls - Bass
Jordan Richardson - Drums
William Gus Seyffert - Bass
Ellen Harper, Sue Chase, Michelle Griepentrog, Jennifer Ohrstrom, Natasha Cockrell - Backing vocals

Production
Producer: Ben Harper
Engineer: Danny Kalb
Management: J.P. Plunier

Charts

Weekly charts

Year-end charts

Certifications

References

Ben Harper albums
2006 albums
Virgin Records albums